Greater Saskatoon Catholic Schools (GSCS)  is Saskatchewan's largest Catholic school division and the third largest school system in the province.

Greater Saskatoon Catholic Schools has approximately 20,000 students in 50 schools located in Saskatoon and the surrounding rural districts of Biggar, Humboldt, Martensville and Warman. In addition, GSCS co-manages Humboldt Collegiate Institute with Horizon School Division No. 205.

Elementary schools
 Bishop Filevich Ukrainian Bilingual School
 Bishop Klein School
 Bishop Pocock School
 Bishop Roborecki School
 École Cardinal Leger School
 École Sister O'Brien School
 École St. Gerard School
 École St. Matthew School
 École St. Mother Teresa School
 École St. Paul School
 École St. Peter School
 Father Robinson School
 Father Vachon School
 Georges Vanier Catholic Fine Arts School
 Holy Family School
 Pope John Paul II School
 St. Angela School
 St. Anne School
 St. Augustine School
 St. Bernard School
 St. Dominic School
 St. Edward School
 St. Frances School - Bateman
 St. Frances School - McPherson
 St. George School
 St. John Community School
 St. Kateri Tekakwitha School
 St. Lorenzo Ruiz School
 St. Luke School
 St. Marguerite School
 St. Maria Goretti Community School
 St. Mark School
 St. Mary's Wellness & Education Centre
 St. Michael Community School
 St. Nicholas School
 St. Philip School
 St. Thérèse of Lisieux School
 St. Volodymyr School
 Saskatoon French School (Associate School)

High schools
 Bethlehem Catholic High School
 Bishop James Mahoney High School
 Bishop Murray High School
 E. D. Feehan Catholic High School
 Holy Cross High School
 Oskāyak High School (Associate School)
 St. Joseph High School

Rural schools
 École Holy Mary School – Martensville 
 Holy Trinity School – Warman
 Humboldt Collegiate Institute – Humboldt (co-managed with Horizon School Division)
 St. Augustine School – Humboldt
 St. Dominic School – Humboldt
 St. Gabriel School – Biggar

Special programs
 Community Credit Program
 Deaf and Hard of Hearing Program (St. Philip)
 EcoJustice Program (St. Edward)
 Farm School Program (Bishop Murray)
 Living Our Faith Together (LOFT) Program (E. D. Feehan)
 Opening Doors Program (Bishop Murray)
 Saskatoon Catholic Cyber School
 START Program (St. Maria Goretti)
 White Buffalo Youth Lodge
 Youth CO-OP Program (Bishop Murray)

Other facilities

 St. Patrick School - Currently St. Frances Cree Bilingual School-Grade 5 to 8
 St. James Elementary School, Nutana Park - Closed in 2005 and used by French high school (École canadienne-française) since 2008.

References

External links
 Greater Saskatoon Catholic Schools

School divisions in Saskatchewan
Education in Saskatoon
Roman Catholic schools in Saskatchewan